Teenage Emotions is the debut studio album by American rapper Lil Yachty. It was released on May 26, 2017, by Capitol Records, Motown, and Quality Control Music. The album features guest appearances from Migos, YG, Kamaiyah, Stefflon Don, Diplo, Grace, and Sonyae Elise, among others.

Teenage Emotions was supported by the singles, "Harley", "Peek a Boo", "Bring It Back", and "X Men". The album received lukewarm reviews from critics and debuted at number five on the US Billboard 200.

Promotion
The album's first single, "Harley", was released on April 14, 2017. The song was produced by K Swisha.

The album's lead single, "Peek a Boo", was released for digital download on April 14, 2017. It was later sent to rhythmic and urban contemporary radio on May 9, 2017. The song features a guest appearance from American hip hop trio Migos, while the production was handled by Ricky Racks. The song peaked at number 78 on the US Billboard Hot 100.
 
The album's third single, "Bring It Back", was released on May 4, 2017. The song was produced by Free School. The album's fourth single, "X Men", was released on May 18, 2017. The song features a guest appearance from American rapper Evander Griiim, while the production was handled by 30 Roc, with co-production by Tillie.

Other songs
A music video for the song, "Dirty Mouth", was released on June 23, 2017. The music video for "Forever Young" featuring Diplo, was released on August 4, 2017. The music video for the song, "Better" featuring Stefflon Don, was released on September 15, 2017, while the music video for "Lady in Yellow", was released on September 28.

Critical reception 

Teenage Emotions was met with lukewarm reviews. At Metacritic, which assigns a normalized rating out of 100 to reviews from professional publications, the album received an average score of 63, based on 15 reviews, indicating "generally favorable reviews". Aggregator AnyDecentMusic? gave it 6.2 out of 10, based on their assessment of the critical consensus.

Ryan Meaney of Consequence stated that "Lil Yachty the pop star shines on Teenage Emotions, and the wide range of styles with which he delivers his message of youthful exuberance shows a growing artist. ... Filler tracks such as "Dirty Mouth" and "Moments in Time" derail the parade of energy Teenage Emotions delivers, leaving the record with too many skip-worthy moments". Ben Beaumont-Thomas of The Guardian saying "Like fellow pop-rappers Rae Sremmurd, Yachty will often use a single melody for the verse and chorus, thus creating a new, disturbing kind of catchiness, a hook that digs into your cortex with such purchase that at least one part of your subconscious is singing it at all times. His freewheeling scansion, meanwhile, stops it being monolithic or boring". Sheldon Pearce, an author for Pitchfork, said, "Though far too long and sometimes aimless, Teenage Emotions is the mind of a child star blown-up and on exhibition at the epicenter of modern rap. It's there to be gawked at and appreciated, and then maybe enjoyed". Christopher R. Weingarten of Rolling Stone said, "Yachty's organic, warts-and-all delivery—when being a perv, when pining for a girl, even singing a song for his mom—makes his music feel simply more naked and human, even with that layer of Auto-Tune". Daniel Bromfield of Pretty Much Amazing said, "The moments when his music really comes alive with joy are the best on Teenage Emotions, and they're often the less rap-oriented moments". Andy Kellman of AllMusic said, "The album's 70-minute length allows enough space for a bounty of mostly nondescript trap productions that support these simplistic boasts. In these tracks, Yachty sounds like he's going through a phase more than refining his individualism".

Calum Slingerland of Exclaim! said, "At over an hour in length, Teenage Emotions is more quantity than quality". Kitty Empire of The Observer said, "It's a graphic exemplar of the contemporary Atlanta sound: stark backing, nagging hook and staccato wordplay, as distinct from the lyricism that traditionalists hold dear". Matthew Ramirez of Spin said, "It's a confusing but enjoyable record that sidesteps the rap hand-wringing and telegraphed weirdness of the drama surrounding Yachty". In his review, Clayton Purdom of The A.V. Club states, "He is at his most interesting on the few occasions where he slips into a sort of uncanny valley of pop music—a bizarro fantasia that he arrives at honestly, like a less satirical PC Music". Scott Glaysher of XXL said, "For the majority of the 20 tracks, each has a different producer and no two songs sound alike. This both helps and hinders the listening experience. On one hand, the scattered sounds align perfectly with the overarching idea of wildly varying teenage emotions, but on the other, it's hard to attentively listen to all the way through—especially with a whopping 21 songs". Writing for The Line of Best Fit, Grant Rindner concluded, "Its best moments are closer to pop-punk and synth-pop than anything resembling traditional hip-hop".

Commercial performance
Teenage Emotions debuted at number five on the US Billboard 200, with 46,000 album-equivalent units, of which 24,000 were streaming units and 20,000 were pure album sales.

Track listing

Notes
  signifies a co-producer

Sample credits
 "Running With a Ghost" contains elements of "Walking With A Ghost", written by Sara Quin and Tegan Quin, as performed by Tegan and Sara.

Personnel
Credits adapted from the album's liner notes.

Performance

 Lil Yachty – primary artist
 Stefflon Don – featured artist (track 9)
 Takeoff – featured artist (track 3)
 Offset – featured artist (track 3)
 CL – featured artist (track 23)
 Evander Griiim – featured artist (track 14)
 Sonyae Elise – featured artist (track 21)
 YG – featured artist (track 6)
 Kamaiyah – featured artist (track 6)
 Quavo – featured artist (track 3)
 Diplo – featured artist (track 10)
 Grace – featured artist (track 16)
 Shaiana – featured artist (track 23)
 Tillie  – additional vocals (tracks 9, 11)
 Alain Whyte – guitars (track 15)
 Esther Anaya – violins (track 20)

Production

 Kevin "Coach K" Lee – executive producer
 Pierre "Pee" Thomas – executive producer
 Mitus – producer (tracks 12, 19)
 Ryan "DJ Replay" Buendia – producer (tracks 15, 20)
 Earl – producer (tracks 8, 22)
 Darnell "Got It" Donohue – producer (tracks 15, 20)
 30 Roc – producer (tracks 4, 14)
 K Swisha – producer (tracks 5, 18)
 Ricky Racks – producer (track 3)
 R!O – producer (track 20)
 Pi'erre Bourne – producer (track 13)
 ILoveUPeter – producer (track 17)
 Jean-Baptiste – producer (tracks 15, 20)
 Lex Luger – producer (track 6)
 Ray McCullough – producer (track 9)
 Michael McHenry – producer (tracks 15, 20)
 TheGoodPerry – producer (track 16)
 WondaGurl – producer (track 11)
 Digital Nas – producer (track 2)
 Diplo – producer (track 10)
 Jeremy Reeves – producer (track 9)
 Ray Romulus – producer (track 9)
 D33J – producer (tracks 1, 23)
 Reefer Alston – producer (track 7)
 BLSSD – producer (track 7)
 TrapMoneyBenny – producer (track 21)
 Jonathan Yip – producer (track 9)
 Tillie – co-producer (tracks 4, 14)
 Dawn Golden – producer (track 10)

Technical

 30 Roc – engineer
 Jason Andrews – engineer
 Cee Copeland – assistant engineer
 Michael "MikFly" Dottin – engineer 
 Stephen "DotCom" Farrow – engineer, mixing assistant
 Todd Hurtt – assistant engineer 
 Christian Kuya – engineer 
 Colin Leonard – mastering
 Tillie – engineer, mixing
 Daryl "DJ Durel" McPherson – engineer
 Michael Piroli – mixing assistant
 Alex "MixedByLex" Romero – assistant engineer 
 D33J – engineer 
 Ethan Stevens – engineer 
 Brandon Suwinski – mixing assistant 
 Princston "Perfect Harmany" Terry – mixing assistant 
 Jordan "J Rich" Walker – engineer 

Miscellaneous

 Mihailo Andic – art direction
 Kenneth Cappello – photography

Charts

Weekly charts

Year-end charts

References

2017 debut albums
Albums produced by D33J
Albums produced by Diplo
Albums produced by Lex Luger
Albums produced by Ricky Racks
Albums produced by Southside (record producer)
Albums produced by WondaGurl
Albums produced by Pi'erre Bourne
Lil Yachty albums
Quality Control Music albums